Bhillama may refer to any of the following rulers of the Seuna (Yadava) dynasty of India:

 Bhillama II (r. c. 985-1005 CE)
 Bhillama V (r. c. 1175-1191 CE)